Stéphane Henchoz (born 7 September 1974) is a Swiss football coach and a former professional player who played as a centre-back, most notably for the English club Liverpool. He was capped 72 times and played for the Switzerland national team from his debut in 1993, and played at Euro 1996 and Euro 2004.

Club career

Early career
Born in Billens, Switzerland, Henchoz first came to notice playing in the German Bundesliga for Hamburger SV.

Blackburn Rovers
In June 1997, he turned down an opportunity to join Manchester United, instead signing for Blackburn Rovers for a fee of £3 million. Henchoz enjoyed a very successful debut Premiership season as Rovers finished sixth in 1997–98, although they were then relegated at the end of the 1998–99 season. Henchoz remained a Premiership player after being purchased for £3.5 million by Liverpool.

Liverpool
At Liverpool, Henchoz became a regular member of the first team during his five-and-a-half year stay at Anfield. Henchoz proved to be an inspirational signing and was popular with the Liverpool fans. He formed an effective central defensive partnership with Sami Hyypiä. This partnership played an important part in Liverpool's historic cup treble in 2001, although it was Henchoz's clumsy challenge on Martin O'Connor in the 90th minute of the League Cup final against Birmingham City that led to extra time (the match itself was only settled on penalties). Henchoz is also remembered for inadvertently blocking a goalbound Thierry Henry shot with his arm in the 17th minute of that year's FA Cup final, Liverpool then went on to win the match with two Michael Owen finishes.

His last two seasons were interrupted due to spells of injury but he still surpassed the 200 mark of games for Liverpool in 2003–04.

With injury problems and Gerard Houllier preferring Igor Bišćan at centre half, Henchoz became something of a bit part player appearing as an occasional right back. Eventually, the Henchoz-Hyypiä partnership was rekindled in 2003–04, helping Liverpool to fourth place in the league.

Celtic
When Rafael Benítez replaced Gérard Houllier as manager, his decision to try versatile English defender Jamie Carragher in partnership with Hyypiä spelled an end to Henchoz's Anfield career. Carragher, previously employed as a full-back, was a revelation at centre back and Henchoz consequently joined Celtic on a six-month contract in January 2005.

Wigan Athletic
Upon the expiration of his Celtic contract, Henchoz opted to move back to the Premier League, signing a one-year contract with newly promoted Wigan Athletic. He made 26 league appearances during the 2005–06 season as the club exceeded expectations with a top half finish. Henchoz also started for Wigan in the 2006 Football League Cup Final.

Return to Blackburn Rovers
Henchoz left Wigan after only a year, signing a contract until the end of the 2006–07 season back with Blackburn Rovers. He was used sparingly during the season to fill in for injuries, but performed suitably. His second spell at Blackburn Rovers came to an end on 19 May, when he was released by Mark Hughes.

Henchoz ended his career on 13 October 2008.

International career
Henchoz earned 72 caps for the Switzerland national team from his debut in 1993. He played for the country at Euro 96 and Euro 2004. He was expected to play in the 2006 FIFA World Cup, but due to health problems he retired from international football on 31 March 2006.

Coaching career

After retiring, Henchoz became manager of Blackburn Rovers's U18 team which he was until June 2009. He then became manager of FC Bulle for the 2009–10 season.

In December 2015, he was appointed assistant manager of Neuchâtel Xamax FCS. On 6 February 2019, the club announced, that they had sacked Michel Decastel and Henchoz would take charge of the club for the rest of the season. At the end of March 2019 the club confirmed, that Henchoz would leave his position at the end of the season.

On 27 May 2019, Henchoz was appointed manager of FC Sion for the upcoming 2019–20 season. He resigned on 4 November 2019 following a 3–0 loss to FC St. Gallen, which was the fifth loss in six league games.

In July 2020, he returned to Neuchâtel Xamax.

Career statistics

Honours
Liverpool
 FA Cup: 2000–01
 League Cup: 2000–01, 2002–03
 FA Charity Shield: 2001; runner-up 2002
 UEFA Cup: 2000–01
 UEFA Super Cup: 2001

Celtic
 Scottish Cup: 2004–05

Individual
 Credit Suisse Player of the Year: 2001, 2002

References

External links
 Player profile at LFChistory.net
 

1974 births
Living people
Sportspeople from the canton of Fribourg
Swiss men's footballers
Association football central defenders
Switzerland international footballers
Neuchâtel Xamax FCS players
Blackburn Rovers F.C. players
Celtic F.C. players
Hamburger SV players
Liverpool F.C. players
Wigan Athletic F.C. players
Swiss Super League players
Bundesliga players
Premier League players
Scottish Premier League players
UEFA Euro 1996 players
UEFA Euro 2004 players
Swiss-French people
UEFA Cup winning players
Swiss football managers
FC Sion managers
FA Cup Final players
Swiss expatriate footballers
Swiss expatriate sportspeople in Germany
Expatriate footballers in Germany
Swiss expatriate sportspeople in England
Expatriate footballers in England
Swiss expatriate sportspeople in Scotland
Expatriate footballers in Scotland